Don Tapscott  (born June 1, 1947) is a Canadian business executive, author, consultant and speaker, who specializes in business strategy, organizational transformation and the role of technology in business and society. He is the CEO of the Tapscott Group and the co-founder and Executive Chairman of the Blockchain Research Institute. He is the former Chancellor of his alma mater Trent University, and is currently an Adjunct Professor of Technology and Operations Management at INSEAD Business School.

Career 
Tapscott has authored or co-authored sixteen books on the application of technology in business and society. His 2006 book, Wikinomics: How Mass Collaboration Changes Everything (2006), co-authored by Anthony D. Williams, was an international bestseller, was number one on the 2007 management book charts and has been translated into 20 different languages.

Tapscott lives in Toronto. He is the former Chancellor of his alma mater Trent University, and is currently an Adjunct Professor of Technology and Operations Management at INSEAD.

Early life and education 

Tapscott was born in Toronto and lived as a teen in Orillia, Ontario, where he was a part of the first graduating class of Park Street Collegiate Institute.

Tapscott holds a B.Sc. in psychology and statistics and an M.Ed. specializing in research methodology. While earning this degree at the University of Alberta, he ran for mayor of Edmonton in the 1977 municipal election on behalf of the Revolutionary Workers' League.

Awards and recognition 

Tapscott holds three honorary degrees—Doctor of Laws (honoris causa)—granted by the University of Alberta in 2001, Trent University in 2006, and McMaster University in 2010.

He was named a Member of the Order of Canada in 2015.

Bibliography 
 Don Tapscott, Del Henderson, Morley Greenberg, Planning for Integrated Office Systems: A Strategic Approach, Carswell Legal Pubns, 1984. .
 Don Tapscott, Del Henderson, Morley Greenberg, Office Automation: A User-Driven Method, Springer, 1985. .
 Don Tapscott, Art Caston, Paradigm Shift: The New Promise of Information Technology, McGraw-Hill Companies, 1992. .
 Don Tapscott, Ann Cavoukian, Who Knows: Safeguarding Your Privacy in a Networked World, McGraw-Hill, 1997. .
 Don Tapscott, The Digital Economy: Promise and Peril In The Age of Networked Intelligence, McGraw-Hill, 1997. .
 Don Tapscott, Growing Up Digital: The Rise of the Net Generation, McGraw-Hill, 1999. .
 Don Tapscott, David Ticoll, Alex Lowy, Blueprint to the Digital Economy: Creating Wealth in the Era of E-Business, McGraw-Hill, 1999. .
 Don Tapscott, Creating Value in the Network Economy, Harvard Business Press, 1999. .
 Don Tapscott, David Ticoll, Alex Lowy, Digital Capital: Harnessing the Power of Business Webs, Harvard Business Press, 2000. .
 Don Tapscott, David Ticoll, The Naked Corporation: How the Age of Transparency Will Revolutionize Business, Free Press, 2003. .
 Don Tapscott, Anthony D. Williams, Wikinomics: How Mass Collaboration Changes Everything, Portfolio Trade, 2006. .
 Don Tapscott, Grown Up Digital: How the Net Generation is Changing Your World, McGraw-Hill, 2008. .
 Don Tapscott, The Net Generation Takes The Lead; in: Willms Buhse/Ulrike Reinhard: Wenn Anzugträger auf Kapuzenpullis treffen (When Suits meet Hoodies), whois-Verlag 2009. .
 Don Tapscott, Anthony D. Williams, Macrowikinomics: Rebooting Business and the World, Portfolio Hardcover, 2010. .
 Don Tapscott, The Digital Economy Anniversary Edition: Rethinking Promise and Peril In the Age of Networked Intelligence, McGraw-Hill, 2014. .
 Don Tapscott, Alex Tapscott, The Blockchain Revolution: How the Technology Behind Bitcoin is Changing Money, Business, and the World, Penguin Books, Released May 2016 ]

References

External links 

 
 
 

1947 births
Living people
Trent University alumni
University of Alberta alumni
Canadian technology writers
Canadian chief executives
Business speakers
HuffPost writers and columnists
Members of the Order of Canada
Academic staff of the University of Toronto
Businesspeople from Toronto
Writers from Toronto
People associated with cryptocurrency